Muhammad Ayub Khuhro (14 August 1901 – 1980) was a Pakistani politician who served as the Chief Minister of Sindh for three terms, and as the Defence Minister in the Feroz Khan Noon Ministry. 

In 1946, Khuhro was elected by the Sindh Provincial Assembly to be among the three members to represent the province in the Constituent Assembly of India but he abdicated attendance until the Mountbatten Plan sanctioned the creation of Pakistan and its own constituent assembly.

Hamida Khuhro, an academic, is his daughter and has written his biography.

See also 
Khuhro
List of members of the 1st Provincial Assembly of Sindh

References

Further reading 

jjjjkkkoooikkllloollkk

Chief Ministers of Sindh
Defence Ministers of Pakistan
Sindhi people
1901 births
1980 deaths
Sindh MPAs 1947–1951
Sindh MPAs 1937–1945
Sindh MPAs 1953–1955
St. Patrick's High School, Karachi alumni
Members of the Constituent Assembly of Pakistan